Satterwhite is a surname. Notable people with the surname include:

Cody Satterwhite (born 1987), American baseball player
Jacolby Satterwhite (born 1986), American artist
John Satterwhite (1943–2014), American expert shotgun sport shooter/Olympic skeet team leader
John W. Satterwhite (1841-1885), American politician; full name John Woodward Satterwhite, Sr.

See also
7219 Satterwhite, a main-belt asteroid